Great Perm (Permyak: Ыджыт Перем Öксуму, Ydžyt Perem Öksumu; Old Permic, 𐍨𐍓𐍖𐍨𐍢 𐍟𐍔𐍠𐍔𐍜 𐍞𐍚𐍡𐍣𐍜𐍣) or simply Perm, in Latin Permia, was a medieval historical region in what is now the Perm Krai of the Russian Federation. Cherdyn is said to have been its capital.

The origin of the name Perm is uncertain. Most common explanation derives the name "Perm" from "parma" ("forested highlands" in Komi language). While the city of Perm is a modern foundation named for Permia, the town of Cherdyn was reportedly itself known as the capital of "Great Perm" in the past. Cherdyn acted as a central market town, and it is sometimes suggested that perm was simply a term for "merchants" or "market" in a local language, but there have been other suggestions. The same name is likely reflected in the toponym Bjarmaland in Norse sagas. The general region of Great Perm was known as wisu (وِيسُو wīsū) in medieval Arab ethnography, so referred to in the works of Ahmad ibn Fadlan, Al-Gharnati, Zakariya al-Qazwini and Yaqut al-Hamawi (in his Dictionary of Countries). The term is perhaps derived from the name of the Ves' people who settled around Lake Ladoga and the upper Sukhona River.

Principality of Great Perm 

The Principality of Great Perm (Velikopermskoye knyazhestvo) emerged as a separate Komi-Permyak feudal entity in the 14th-15th centuries owing to the easing of the Novgorod Republic. The principality retained a degree of autonomy under the Muscovite rule, but was eventually absorbed into it in 1505.

The principality was located in the Upper Kama area and maintained close connections with nearby Perm of Vychegda (alternatively known as Perm the Minor). Both Perm states had paid tribute to the Novgorod Republic since the 9th or 10th centuries. Perm of Vychegda was Christianised by Stephen of Perm in the fourteenth century and subsequently subdued by Muscovy. In 1451 a House of Princes of Perm gained control of both territories as vassals of Moscow, with the titles of princes Vymsky, and princes Velikopermsky. In fact even though having been Christianised soon after Perm of Vychegda, Great Perm enjoyed greater independence, positioned between three powers: Moscow, the Novgorod, and Kazan. Finally in 1472 an army of vassals of Moscow with the princes Vymsky among them conquered Great Perm and captured their brother Prince Mikhail Velikopermsky. Nevertheless, the latter soon came back again from Moscow as governor and ruled his domain for life. His son Matthew Velikopermsky was finally deposed by the Grand Prince of Moscow in 1505.

Up to the early 18th century, the name Great Perm was officially used of the Upper Kama area, a southern part of which was governed by the Stroganov family.

The name was borrowed (as the 'Permian' period) by the nineteenth century geologist Sir Roderick Murchison to refer to rocks of a certain age, following extensive studies which he conducted in the region.

See also
Bjarmaland
Permians
Chud

References

Further reading
 V. Oborin. The Settlement and Developing of Ural in Late Eleventh – Early Seventeenth Centuries. University of Irkutsk, 1990.

External links
Е.Вершинин. Пермь Великая. Как Москва пришла на Урал 
Вычегодско-Вымская летопись 
Энциклопедия Пермского края  
ПЕРМЬ ВЕЛИКАЯ - Культурное наследие Прикамья 

1505 disestablishments
Perm Krai
Medieval Russia
Permians
Novgorod Republic
Historical regions in Russia